HMS Sirius was a  light cruiser of the Royal Navy. She was built by Portsmouth Dockyard (Portsmouth, United Kingdom), with the keel being laid down on 6 April 1938. She was launched on 18 September 1940, and commissioned 6 May 1942.

History
Siriuss completion was delayed due to German bombing at Portsmouth Dockyard so she was completed at Scotts Shipbuilding and Engineering Company (Greenock, Scotland). On completion she initially joined the Home Fleet, and was then assigned to operate in the Mediterranean in August for Operation Pedestal, the supply of Malta. She was then ordered to the South Atlantic to patrol against Axis blockade runners on the Far East route, returning to Gibraltar in November for Operation Torch, the North African landings. As part of Force Q at Bone in December she harried Axis convoys to and from Tunisia until the Axis surrender in North Africa.

Force Q, including Sirius, took part in the last naval battle held in the Mediterranean Sea during 1942. The Axis convoy consisted of the German troopship KT-1 and Italian troopships Aventino, Puccini and Aspromonte (a militarized ferry-boat) and an escort force composed of three destroyers and two torpedo boats. Force Q intercepted the convoy on the night of 1–2 December. The British ships attacked and sank all four troopships alongside one of the escorting destroyers, heavily damaging another and both torpedo boats. The destroyer Camicia Nera launched all of her six torpedoes from a range of only 2 kilometers, but missed the British ships. At dawn, the savage short-range engagement revealed a clear British victory: Axis losses amounted to 5 ships and over 2000 men, for the loss of HMS Quentin (G78) at dawn to Luftwaffe dive bombers.

Sirius then joined the 12th Cruiser Squadron and participated in the Allied invasion of Sicily, (Operation Husky), in July.

After bombarding Kos Harbour with HMS Aurora (12) on 17 October, Sirius came under sustained air attack off the island of Karpathos. She was hit on the quarterdeck by a 250 Kg bomb, starting fires aft and killing 14 sailors, forcing her to withdraw to Massawa for repairs. These were carried out between November 1943 and February 1944, when the ship returned to Britain for Operation Overlord, the Normandy landings, where she was part of the reserve of the Eastern Task Force. In August, she returned to Mediterranean waters for the landings in the south of France, Operation Dragoon. She then served again in the Aegean, where, in October 1944, she was present during the reoccupation of Athens. Sirius remained with the Mediterranean Fleet, 15th Cruiser Squadron, postwar until 1946. After a refit at Portsmouth in 1946, Sirius joined the 2nd Cruiser Squadron with the Home Fleet in March 1947.

She was paid off in 1949 and was put up for disposal in 1956. On 15 October 1956 Sirius arrived at the Blyth yard of Hughes Bolckow for breaking up.

References

Bibliography

External links

WWII cruisers
HMS Sirius at Uboat.net

 

Dido-class cruisers
Ships built on the River Clyde
1940 ships
World War II cruisers of the United Kingdom